Dragna is an Italian surname and may refer to:

Jack Dragna (1891–1956), Los Angeles crime family mobster
Louis Tom Dragna (1920–2012), Los Angeles mobster and Jack's nephew
Tom Dragna (1889–1977), Los Angeles mobster, father of Louis, brother of Jack

Italian-language surnames